Hamza Mulindwa Muwonge (born 6 November 1982) is an Ugandan international footballer who plays for Bright Stars, as a goalkeeper.

Career
Born in Kampala, Muwonge has played club football for Ggaba United, Kampala United, Simba, Bunamwaya / Vipers, Thika United and Bright Stars.

He made his international debut for Uganda in 2007, and has appeared in FIFA World Cup qualifying matches for them.

References

1982 births
Living people
Ugandan footballers
Uganda international footballers
Simba FC players
Vipers SC players
Thika United F.C. players
Bright Stars FC players
Association football goalkeepers
Ugandan expatriate footballers
Ugandan expatriate sportspeople in Kenya
Expatriate footballers in Kenya
Sportspeople from Kampala
Uganda A' international footballers
2011 African Nations Championship players